Yusuf ibn Tashfin, also Tashafin, Teshufin, (reigned c. 1061 – 1106) was leader of the Berber Almoravid empire. He co-founded the city of Marrakesh and led the Muslim forces in the Battle of Sagrajas. Yusuf ibn Tashfin came to Al-Andalus from the Maghreb to help the Muslims fight against Alfonso VI, eventually achieving victory in Sagrajas and promoting an Islamic system in the region. In 1061 he took the title “Amir al-Muslimeen” recognising the suzerainty of the Abbasid Caliphate. He was married to Zaynab an-Nafzawiyyah, whom he reportedly trusted politically.

Succession to power
Yusuf ibn Tashfin was a Berber from the Banu Turgut, a branch of the Lamtuna, a Tuareg tribe belonging to the Sanhaja group. The Sanhaja were linked by medieval Muslim genealogists with the Yemeni tribe of Himyar through semi-mythical and mythical pre-Islamic kings and for some reason, some of the contemporary sources (e.g., Ibn al-Arabi) add the nisba al-Himyari to Yusuf's name to indicate this legendary affiliation. For example, his surname is documented as Al-Sanhaji Al-Himyari in the 14th century work by Ismail ibn al-Ahmar. Modern scholarship rejects this Berber–Yemeni link as fanciful.

Abu Bakr ibn Umar, a natural leader of Lamtuna extraction, a branch of the Sanhaja, and one of the original disciples of ibn Yasin who served as a spiritual liaison for followers of the Maliki school of Islamic jurisprudence, was appointed chief commander after the death of his brother Yahya ibn Umar al-Lamtuni. His brother oversaw the military for ibn Yasin but was killed in the Battle of Tabfarilla against the Godala tribes in 1056. Ibn Yasin, too, would die in battle against the Barghawata three years later. Abu-Bakr was an able general, taking the fertile Sūs and its capital Aghmāt a year after his brother's death, and would go on to suppress numerous revolts in the Sahara—on one such occasion entrusting his pious cousin Yusuf with the stewardship of Sūs and thus the whole of his northern provinces. He appears to have handed him this authority in the interim but even went as far as to give Yusuf his wife, Zaynab an-Nafzawiyyah, purportedly the richest woman of Aghmāt. This sort of trust and favor on the part of a seasoned veteran and savvy politician reflected the general esteem in which Yusuf was held, not to mention the power he attained as a military figure in his absence. Daunted by Yusuf's new-found power, Abu Bakr saw any attempts at recapturing his post politically unfeasible and returned to the fringes of the Sahara to settle the unrest of the southern frontier.

Taifa appeal
In the year 1091, the last sovereign king of al-Andalus, al-Mu'tamid, saw his Abbadid-inherited taifa of Seville, controlled since 1069, in jeopardy of being taken by the increasingly stronger king of Castile-León, Alfonso VI. The Taifa period followed the demise of the Umayyad Caliphate. Previously, the emir had launched a series of aggressive attacks on neighboring kingdoms, so as to amass more territory for himself, but his military aspirations and capabilities paled in comparison to those of the Castilian king, who in the name of Christendom, in 1085, captured Toledo and exacted parias, or tribute, from Muslim princes in places such as Granada, al-Mu'tamid of Seville being no exception. The tribute of the emirs bolstered the economy of the Christian kingdom, and harmed the Muslim economy. These are the circumstances that led to the Almoravid conquest and the famous quote, rebuffing his son, Rashid, who advised him not to call on Yusuf ibn Tashfin, where al-Mu'tamid said

Military exploits 

Yusuf was an effective general and strategist who put together a formidable army comprising Sudanese contingents, Christian mercenaries and the Saharan tribes of the Gudala, Lamtuna and Masufa, which enabled him to expand the empire, crossing the Atlas Mountains onto the plains of Morocco, reaching the Mediterranean and capturing Fez in 1075, Tangier and Oujda in 1079, Tlemcen in 1080, and Ceuta in 1083, as well as Algiers, Ténès and Oran in 1082-83. He is regarded as the co-founder of the famous Moroccan city Marrakech (in Berber Murakush, corrupted to Morocco in English). The site had been chosen and work started by Abu Bakr in 1070. The work was completed by Yusef, who then made it the capital of his empire, in place of the former capital Aghmāt. By the time Abu Bakr died in 1087, after a skirmish in the Sahara as the result of a poison arrow, Yusef had crossed over into al-Andalus and also achieved victory at the Battle of az-Zallaqah, also known as the Battle of Sagrajas in the west. He came to al-Andalus with a force of 15,000 men, armed with javelins and daggers, most of his soldiers carrying two swords, shields, cuirass of the finest leather and animal hide, and accompanied by drummers for psychological effect. Yusef's cavalry was said to have included 6,000 shock troops from Senegal mounted on white Arabian horses. Camels were also put to use. On October 23, 1086, the Almoravid forces, accompanied by 10,000 Andalusian fighters from local Muslim provinces, decisively checked the Reconquista, significantly outnumbering and defeating the largest Christian army ever assembled up to that point. The death of Yusef's heir, however, prompted his speedy return to Africa.

When Yusuf returned to al-Andalus in 1090, he saw the lax behavior of the taifa kings, both spiritually and militarily, as a breach of Islamic law and principles, and left Africa with the express purpose of usurping the power of all the Muslim principalities, under the auspices of the Abbasid caliph of Baghdad, with whom he had shared correspondence, and under the slogan "The spreading of righteousness, the correction of injustice and the abolition of unlawful taxes." The emirs in such cities as Seville, Badajoz, Almeria and Granada had grown accustomed to the extravagant ways of the west. On top of doling out tribute to the Christians and giving Andalusian Jews unprecedented freedoms and authority, they had levied burdensome taxes on the populace to maintain this lifestyle. After a series of fatwas and careful deliberation, Yusef saw the implementation of orthodoxy as long overdue. That year, he exiled the emirs 'Abdallah and his brother Tamim from Granada and Málaga, respectively, to Aghmāt, and a year later al-Mutamid of Seville suffered the same fate. When all was said and done, Yusef united all of the Muslim dominions of the Iberian Peninsula, with the exception of Zaragoza, to the Kingdom of Morocco, and situated his royal court at Marrakech. He took the title of Amir al-muslimin (Prince of the Muslims), seeing himself as humbly serving the caliph of Baghdad, but to all intents and purposes he was considered the caliph of the western Islamic empire. The military might of the Almoravids was at its peak.

The Sanhaja confederation, which consisted of a hierarchy of Lamtuna, Musaffa and Djudalla Berbers, represented the military's top brass. Amongst them were Andalusian Christians and heretic Africans, taking up duties as diwan al-gund, Yusef's own personal bodyguard, including 2,000 black horsemen, whose tasks also included registering soldiers and making sure they were compensated financially. The occupying forces of the Almoravids were made up largely of horsemen, totaling no less than 20,000. Into the major cities of al-Andalus, Seville (7,000), Granada (1,000), Cordoba (1,000), 5,000 bordering Castile and 4,000 in western al-Andalus, succeeding waves of horsemen, in conjunction with the garrisons that had been left there after the Battle of Sagrajas, made responding, for the Taifa emirs, difficult. Soldiers on foot used bows & arrows, sabres, pikes, javelins, each protected by a cuirass of Moroccan leather and iron-spiked shields. During the siege of the fort-town Aledo, in Murcia, previously captured by the Spaniard Garcia Giménez, Almoravid and Andalusian hosts are said to have used catapults, in addition to their customary drum beat. Yusef also established naval bases in Cadiz, Almeria and neighboring ports along the Mediterranean. Ibn Maymun, the governor of Almeria, had a fleet at his disposal. Another such example is the Banu Ghaniya fleet stationed off the Balearic Islands that dominated the affairs of the western Mediterranean for much of the 12th century.

Siege of Valencia
Although the Almoravids had not gained much in the way of territory from the Christians, rather than merely offsetting the Reconquista, Yusuf did succeed in capturing Valencia. A city divided between Muslims and Christians, under the weak rule of a petty emir paying tribute to the Christians, including the famous El Cid, Valencia proved to be an obstacle for the Almoravid military, despite their untouchable reputation. Abu Bakr ibn Ibrahim ibn Tashfin and Yusef's nephew Abu 'Abdullah Muhammad both failed to defeat El Cid. Yusef then sent Abu'l-Hasan 'Ali al-Hajj, but he was not successful either. In 1097, on his fourth trip to al-Andalus, Yusef sought to personally dig down and fight the armies of Alfonso VI, making his way towards the all but abandoned, yet historically important, Toledo. Such a concerted effort was meant to draw the Christian forces, including those laying siege to Valencia, into the center of Iberia. On August 15, 1097, the Almoravids delivered yet another blow to Alfonso's forces, a battle in which El Cid's son was killed.

Muhammad ibn 'A'isha, Yusef's son, whom he had appointed governor of Murcia, succeeded in delivering an effective pounding to the Cid's forces at Alcira; still not capturing the city, but satisfied with the results of his campaigns, Yusef left for his court at Marrakesh, only to return two years later in a new effort to take the provinces of eastern al-Andalus. After El Cid died in the same year, 1099, his wife Jimena began ruling until the coming of another Almoravid campaign at the tail end of 1100, led by Yusef's trusted lieutenant Mazdali ibn Tilankan. After a seven-month siege, Alfonso and Jimena, despairing of the prospects of staving off the Almoravids, set fire to the great mosque in anger and abandoned the city. Yusef had finally conquered Valencia achieving dominance over eastern al-Andalus. He receives mention in the oldest Spanish epic Poema del Cid, also known as El Cantar del Mio Cid.

Description and character
"A wise and shrewd man, neither too prompt in his determinations, nor too slow in carrying them into effect", Yusef was very much adapted to the rugged terrain of the Sahara and had no interests in the pomp of the Andalusian courts. Unlike many other Muslim leaders of the time, Yusef spoke Arabic poorly.

According to medieval Arabic writers, Yusuf was of average build and stature. He is further described as having "had a clear brown complexion and he had a thin beard. His voice was soft, his speech elegant. His eyes were black, his nose was hooked, and he had fat on the fleshy portions of his ears. His hair was curly and his eyebrows met above his nose."

Legacy 
His son and successor, Ali ibn Yusuf, was viewed as just as devout a Muslim as his father. Córdoba, in about 1119, served as the launch pad for Andalusian insurrection. Christians on the northern frontier gained momentum shortly after his father's death, and the Almohads, beginning about 1120, were to engulf the southern frontier. This ultimately led to the disintegration of Yusef's hard-gained territories by the time of Ibrahim ibn Tashfin (1146) and Ishaq ibn Ali (1146–1147), the last of the Almoravid dynasty.

Ali ibn Yusef in 1135 exercised good stewardship by attending to the University of Al-Karaouine and ordering the extension of the mosque from 18 to 21 aisles, expanding the structure to more than 3,000 square meters. Some accounts suggest that to carry out this work Ali ibn Yusef hired two Andalusian architects, who also built the central aisle of the Great Mosque of Tlemcen, Algeria, in 1136.

In popular culture
In the 1961 movie El Cid, Yusuf ibn Tashfin is portrayed, under the name "Ben Yussuf", by Herbert Lom.
Yusuf appears in Age of Empires II: The Conquerors as one of the primary antagonists in the "El Cid" campaign. However, he is described as "never showing his face", always covering it with a cloth.
Yusuf ibn Tashfin appears as protagonist in 's Urdu Novel "Yusuf bin Tashfeen".
Yusuf ibn Tashfin appears as Hero in the Drama Serial "Pukaar", presented by Pakistan's Pakistan Television Corporation in 1995. In this series, the main characters were Yousaf bin Tashfin (played by Asal Din Khan), Zainab (Yousaf's wife), Ali (Yousaf's son), Alfonso VI (played by Ayub Khosa), Mutamid bin abi Abbad (played by Hissam Qazi (Late)), and a princess of Leon (played by Laila Wasti).
Yusuf appears in El Cid: the Legend as the primary antagonist. In the film, he is a cruel, unforgiving and evil man. Much unlike his alleged reputation as an honorable man.

References

Sources
Richard Fletcher, Moorish Spain, (University of California Press, 1992)
Ibn Idhari, Al-bayan al-mughrib Part III, annotated Spanish translation by A. Huici Miranda, Valencia, 1963.
 N. Levtzion & J.F.P. Hopkins, Corpus of early Arabic sources for West African history, Cambridge University Press, 1981,  (reprint: Markus Wiener, Princeton, 2000). Contains English translations of extracts from medieval works dealing with the Almoravids; the selections cover some (but not all) of the information above.
E. A. Freeman, History and Conquests of the Saracens, (Oxford, 1856)
Codera, Decadencia y desaparición de los Almorávides en España (1889)
H. R. Idris, Regierung und Verwaltung des vorderen Orients in islamischer Zeit, (Brill Academic Publishers, 1997)

1009 births
1106 deaths
11th-century Berber people
12th-century Berber people
Almoravid emirs
Berber rulers
City founders
History of Marrakesh
Lamtuna